Pocasset is a town in Grady County, Oklahoma, United States. The population was 156 at the 2010 census, down from 192 in 2000.

Geography
Pocasset is located in northwestern Grady County at  (35.193955, -97.953891). U.S. Route 81 passes through the town center, leading south  to Chickasha, the county seat, and north  to Minco.

Demographics

As of the census of 2000, there were 192 people, 75 households, and 54 families living in the town. There were 93 housing units at an average density of 195.0 per square mile (74.8/km2). The racial makeup of the town was 91.67% White, 2.60% Native American, 2.60% from other races, and 3.12% from two or more races. Hispanic or Latino of any race were 6.77% of the population.

There were 75 households, out of which 36.0% had children under the age of 18 living with them, 60.0% were married couples living together, 8.0% had a female householder with no husband present, and 28.0% were non-families. 26.7% of all households were made up of individuals, and 5.3% had someone living alone who was 65 years of age or older. The average household size was 2.56 and the average family size was 3.09.

In the town, the population was spread out, with 30.7% under the age of 18, 9.4% from 18 to 24, 29.7% from 25 to 44, 16.7% from 45 to 64, and 13.5% who were 65 years of age or older. The median age was 33 years. For every 100 females, there were 90.1 males. For every 100 females age 18 and over, there were 95.6 males.

The median income for a household in the town was $25,417, and the median income for a family was $30,250. Males had a median income of $26,250 versus $15,000 for females. The per capita income for the town was $10,751. About 11.1% of families and 16.0% of the population were below the poverty line, including 22.4% of those under the age of eighteen and 8.3% of those 65 or over.

References

Towns in Grady County, Oklahoma
Towns in Oklahoma